The 133rd district of the Texas House of Representatives contains parts of Harris County. The current Representative is Jim Murphy, who was first elected in 2018.

References 

133